Sodium tungstate is the inorganic compound with the formula Na2WO4. This white, water-soluble solid is the sodium salt of tungstic acid.  It is useful as a source of tungsten for chemical synthesis. It is an intermediate in the conversion of tungsten ores to the metal.

Preparation and structure
Sodium tungstate is obtained by digestion of tungsten ores, the economically important representatives of which are tungstates, in base. Illustrative is the extraction of sodium tungstate from wolframite: 
Fe/MnWO4  +  2 NaOH  +  2 H2O   →   Na2WO4·2H2O   +  Fe/Mn(OH)2
Scheelite is treated similarly using sodium carbonate.

Sodium tungstate can also be produced by treating tungsten carbide with a mixture of sodium nitrate and sodium hydroxide in a fusion process which overcomes the high exothermicity of the reaction involved.

Several polymorphs of sodium tungstate are known, three at only one atmosphere pressure.  They feature tetrahedral orthotungstate dianions but differ in the packing motif.  The  anion adopts a structure like sulfate.

Reactions
Treatment of sodium tungstate with hydrochloric acid gives the tungsten trioxide or its acidic hydrates:
Na2WO4  +  2 HCl  →  WO3  +  2 NaCl  +  H2O
Na2WO4  +  2 HCl  →  WO3·H2O  +  2 NaCl
 
This reaction can be reversed using aqueous sodium hydroxide

Uses
The dominant use of sodium tungstate is as an intermediate in the extraction of tungsten from its ores, almost all of which are tungstates. Otherwise sodium tungstate has only niche applications.

In organic chemistry, sodium tungstate is used as catalyst for epoxidation of alkenes and oxidation of alcohols into aldehydes or ketones. It exhibits anti-diabetic effects.

Solutions of sodium and lithium metatungstates are used in density separation. Such solutions are less toxic than bromoform and methylene iodide, but still have densities that fall between a number of naturally coupled minerals.

Sodium tungstate is a competitive inhibitor of molybdenum; because tungsten is directly below molybdenum on the periodic table, it has similar electrochemical properties. Dietary tungsten reduces the concentration of molybdenum in tissues. Some bacteria use molybdenum cofactor as part of their respiratory chain; in these microbes, tungstate can replace molybdenum and inhibit the generation of energy by aerobic respiration. As such, one niche use of sodium tungstate is in experimental biology—where it has been found that adding sodium tungstate to the drinking water of mice inhibits the growth of Enterobacteriaceae (a family of endogenous opportunistic pathogens) in the gut.

References

External links
 The Anti-Diabetic Effects Of Sodium Tungstate Revealed, ScienceDaily, Aug. 28, 2009

Tungstates
Sodium compounds
Tungsten mining